At the 1908 Summer Olympics, a polo tournament was contested. It was the second time the sport had been featured at the Olympics, with 1900 being its first appearance. The venue was the Hurlingham Polo Grounds in London. The Hurlingham Club presented a Challenge Cup to the winner of the tournament, which consisted of three teams. All three teams represented the British Olympic Association, with two from England and one from Ireland. The two English teams played each first, with the winner playing against the Irish team. Roehampton won both games, taking the gold medal, while the other two teams did not face each other to break the tie for second place.

Background

This was the second time that polo was played at the Olympics; the sport had previously appeared in 1900 and would appear again in 1920, 1924, and 1936. Each time, the tournament was for men only.

No nations made their debut in polo in 1908, as Great Britain was the only nation represented and was making its second appearance.

Competition format

Only two games were played. The winner of the first game played the team that had a bye. Games were played in six periods of ten minutes each.

Medal table

Medal summary

Team rosters

Hurlingham

 Walter Buckmaster
 Frederick Freake
 Walter Jones
 John Wodehouse

Ireland

 John Hardress Lloyd
 John Paul McCann
 Percy O'Reilly
 Auston Rotherham

Roehampton

 Charles Darley Miller
 George Arthur Miller
 Patteson Womersley Nickalls
 Herbert Haydon Wilson

Results

Game 1

Hurlingham scored first, with a goal in the second period by Jones. It would be the only goal scored by the team, however, as Roehampton answered with two goals in the third and added another in the fifth.

Game 2

The second game was decidedly more lopsided than the first, with Roehampton scoring twice in the first period and Miller adding three more himself in the second. Ireland scored its only goal shortly before the end of the match, when the team was already down 8-0.

Sources 

 
 

1908 Summer Olympics events
1908
Polo competitions in the United Kingdom
1908 in polo
1908 in Irish sport
Men's events at the 1908 Summer Olympics